HSFCruise Bonaria is a Ro-Pax high speed ferry, built in 2000 at the Sestri Ponente shipyards by Fincantieri and owned by Grimaldi Lines previously owned by Minoan Lines. It can accommodate up to 2,500 passengers and 700 cars, and has 758 beds plus 742 airseats for passengers. The vessel is powered by four 4x Wärtsilä 16V46C diesel engines with a combined power of 67,517 kW, which give her a top 'speed of 31,6 knots. In November 2020 Minoan Lines announced that Knossos Palace exchanged with her former ship Cruise Bonaria previously named Olympia Palace. The first sold to Grimaldi Lines and renamed it Cruise Bonaria and the other one renamed Knossos Palace. The former Knossos Palace was under the Minoan Lines 20 years. For 20 years did the Piraeus-Heraklion route. The ship left Greece forever on 24 November and arrived in Napoli, Italy after two days. In there will change signals and name.

Route
Knossos Palace served the overnight route Piraeus - Heraklio and Heraklio - Piraeus, except for some rare occasions in which it replaces other ships of Minoan Lines in their routes. During the holiday season, it occasionally operated during daytime, completing her voyage in 8 hours.

Accidents and incidents
On November 19, 2003 Knossos Palace was sailing 40 nm northwest of Heraklion en route from Piraeus when a fire broke out on board. The fire was caused by a truck in the vessel's garage that was carrying chemicals. The crew swiftly dealt with the emergency and the fire was put out using the sprinkler system before causing major damage. However, the fire damaged the cables powering the passenger drawbridge, which became inoperable. As a result, an airport staircase had to be brought to the port in order to allow safe disembarkation.

References 

Ferries of Greece
Ships built in Genoa
2000 ships
Ships built by Fincantieri